George Naz  (جارج ناز)  a Pakistani Christian who led the protest against the Badami Bagh arson in Jehlum in March 2013, himself became the target of the strict anti-blasphemy law.  Naz   an employee of the District Municipal Administration, Jehlum as well a known Christian local leader led the protest against the misuse of the blasphemy laws.  A banner which read as "Blasphemy law is back law and a hanging sword on Christians" became the bone of contention.  On 21 March 2013, a First information report was registered against him in the local police station in Jehlum City. He was rescued by Farrukh Saif Foundation and their Partner Keith Davies in 2014, United Nations High Commissioner for Refugees granted him refugee status in 2017.

References

People convicted of blasphemy in Pakistan
Persecution of Christians in Pakistan
People persecuted by Muslims
2014 in Pakistan
Living people
2014 in Islam
2014 in Christianity
Year of birth missing (living people)